Saul Solomon (1817–1892) was a politician of the Cape Colony.

Saul Solomon may also refer to:
 Saul Solomon (photographer) (1836–1929), Australian artist and politician 
 Saul Solomon (New Zealand barrister) (1857–1937), New Zealand lawyer and King's Counsel (1907)
 Saul Solomon (judge) (1875–1960), South African judge and King's Counsel (1919)